Oktay Kuday (born 6 August 1979) is a German-Turkish former professional footballer who played as a striker.

Club career
Kuday was born in Karlsruhe. He formerly played for Karlsruher SC, Altay, Manisaspor, Mardinspor, Elazığspor and Tokatspor. He appeared in one German Bundesliga match for Karlsruher SC during the 1997–98 season. Kuday also appeared in 23 Turkish Süper Lig matches for Altay S.K. during the 2002–03 season.

References

External links
 

1979 births
Living people
Turkish footballers
German footballers
German people of Turkish descent
Karlsruher SC players
Karlsruher SC II players
Bundesliga players
Altay S.K. footballers
Manisaspor footballers
Elazığspor footballers
Göztepe S.K. footballers
Footballers from Karlsruhe
Association football forwards